The ninth cycle of America's Next Top Model was the third season of the series to be aired on The CW network. This cycle's promotional tagline was "The Future Of Fashion." The promotional song was "Shut Up and Drive" by Rihanna.

The prizes for this cycle were:

 A modeling contract with Elite Model Management
 A fashion spread and cover in Seventeen magazine
 A 100,000 contract with CoverGirl cosmetics

The international destinations for this cycle were St. John's, Antigua and Barbuda (for the semi-finals) and Shanghai and Beijing, China. The show’s second visit to East Asia. 

Among the thirteen finalists was 21-year-old Heather Kuzmich, who has Asperger's syndrome, an autism spectrum disorder. The season averaged 5.12 million viewers, making the cycle one of the most successful in the show's history. This was also the last cycle to date in which Twiggy was featured as a judge. For cycle 10, she was replaced by Paulina Porizkova.

The winner was 21-year-old Saleisha Stowers from Los Angeles, California with Chantal Jones placing as the runner up.

Contestants
(Ages stated are at start of contest)

Episodes
<onlyinclude>{{Episode table |overall = 2 |background = #BFBDC1 |season = 2 |title = 20 | airdate = 5 | viewers = 5 |country = US | episodes =

{{Episode list/sublist|America's Next Top Model (season 9)
| EpisodeNumber   = 109
| EpisodeNumber2  = 13
| Title           = The Girl Who Becomes America's Next Top Model
| OriginalAirDate = 
| Viewers         = 5.50
| ShortSummary    = The final three were put to the test when they had to shoot a CoverGirl commercial for CoverGirl Wetslicks Fruit Spritzers. The girls got to choose from twelve fruity flavors to portray in their commercials. All the girls struggled with their commercials at first, but Chantal managed to pull off good takes in the end, although Jenah's attitude came off as slightly abrasive to Jay, and Saleisha (who was the weakest) asked for a minute to compose herself due to frustration.

Before evaluation, the girls were asked to critique their competition. All the girls commented themselves as having the most potential, but Jenah's laid-back attitude caused her to be deemed as having the least. As she was being evaluated, Jenah broke down into tears but was praised by Tyra for finally showing her real self to the panel. Jenah's and Chantal's photos were heavily praised while Saleisha's was criticized. Saleisha and Jenah landed in the bottom two. It was pointed out that Saleisha may have had modeling experience in the past, but her portfolio was hit and miss, though it was improving when they came overseas, while Chantal, without any modeling experience in the past, had taken much stronger photos than Saleisha. In the end, Jenah was eliminated in her third consecutive bottom two appearance.

Featured photographer: Jim De Yonker
Featured commercial director: Brent Poer

The final two had a photoshoot for Seventeen magazine's February cover issue. The final runway took place near the Forbidden City, where Saleisha and Chantal modeled Qi Gang's line of couture dresses. Cycle 8 winner Jaslene Gonzalez started off the show. Chantal was a bit stiff and had a slight accident when her dress tripped a stilt performer, while Saleisha owned the runway show. Behind the scenes, Saleisha consoled Chantal, who was slightly distraught about tripping the stilt performer.

During the final panel, the judges praised both finalists' personalities and their pictures throughout the season. The judges praised Chantal's bubbly personality and blend of high-fashion and girl-next-door appeal, and Saleisha’s commercial ability and holistic modeling potential. The girls were called back, and Saleisha was declared the ninth winner of America's Next Top Model'

Special guests: Qi Gang, Darren Duan, Ann Shoket, Jaslene Gonzalez, Stephen Danelian
| LineColor       = BFBDC1
}}
}}</onlyinclude>

Summaries

Call-out order

 The contestant was eliminated
 The contestant quit the competition
 The contestant was originally eliminated but was saved
 The contestant won the competition

Bottom two

 The contestant was eliminated after her first time in the bottom two
 The contestant was eliminated after her second time in the bottom two
 The contestant was eliminated after their third time in the bottom two
 The contestant quit the competition
 The contestant was originally eliminated but was saved.
 The contestant was eliminated in the final judging and placed as the runner-up

Average  call-out order
Casting call-out order and final two are not included.

Photo shoot guide
Episode 2 photo shoot: Glamour shots smoking/detriments of smoking
Episode 3 photo shoot: Couture Rock Climbing
Episode 4 photo shoot: Flowers & plant life
Episode 5 photo shoot: Fashion gargoyles on top of building
Episode 6 photo shoot: Eco-friendly fashion portraying recyclable materials
Episode 8 music video: Enrique Iglesias, "Tired of Being Sorry"
Episode 9 photo shoot: Stranded in the desert
Episode 10 commercial & photo shoot: CoverGirl queen collection ad & commercial
Episode 11 photo shoot: Chinese princesses / lion & dragon dance
Episode 12 photo shoot: Great Wall of China warriors/Group shot
Episode 13 Commercial & photo shoot: CoverGirl wetslicks fruit spritzers commercial & print ad; Seventeen magazine covers

Other cast members
 Jay Manuel – Photo Director
 Sutan – Make-up Artist
 Christian Marc – Hair Stylist
 Anda & Masha – Wardrobe
 Ann Shoket

Makeovers
 Victoria - Blonde highlights with lengthen bangs
 Janet - Dyed black with bangs
 Ebony - Naomi Campbell inspired long black weave
 Sarah - Cut short with blonde highlights
 Ambreal - Pixie cut and dyed black
 Lisa - Cut short and dyed light brown
 Heather - Trimmed with chestnut brown highlights
 Bianca - Buzz cut(due to long golden blonde weave being unable to work)
 Jenah - Long blonde extensions with bangs 
 Chantal - Long platinum blonde extensions with bangs
 Saleisha - Louise Brooks inspired black bob with bangs

Post-Top Model careers

Mila Bouzinova did some test shots, did some print work for Cosmopolitan and used to be signed with Basic Model Management in New York.
Jenah Doucette has done some test shots and print work and was featured as one of the presenter in Tyra's Fiercee Awards on The Tyra Banks Show in 2008.
Bianca Golden is currently signed with Major Model Management in New York, Fusion Model Management in South Africa, Ford Models in Chicago and Click Models in Boston. She was one of the models in the finale of fifth season of Project Runway. She has modeled in Essence, Cosmopolitan, The Source and for various brands. She has also taken part in Farah Angsana Spring 2010 presentation as well as multiple fashion weeks and BET's Rip The Runway shows. Bianca has also appeared on The Tyra Banks Show several times. She also participated the all-star version of America's Next Top Model along with other returning models, and was eliminated in episode 7 alongside fellow contestant Kayla Ferrel.
Sarah Hartshorne is currently signed with IPM Model Management and a comedian in New York City.
Lisa Jackson is currently signed with Major Model Management in New York, Studio Model Management in Paris and Muse Model Management in New York.  She was one of the models in the finale of sixth season and was the model for designer Michelle Lesniak Franklin, Season 11, of Project Runway and walked for TRESemme at Mara Hoffman Spring 2010 show amongst many other shows. She has also modeled for Source, Carmen Marc Valvo and numerous brands and magazines. She has also been featured twice in Top Models In Action, the first time in Cycle 11, and the second in Cycle 13. She has appeared in the music video for Sean Paul's "She Doesn't Mind". Lisa also was the winning model on season 11 of Project Runway, winning $25,000 and the cover of Marie Claire.
Chantal Jones is currently signed with Nous Model Management, L.A. Model Management, Paragon Model Management in Mexico Muse Model Management in New York. She used to be signed with 62 Models & Talent in Auckland.
Heather Kuzmich is currently signed with Elite Model Management in Chicago. She is also pursuing a career in the video game industry and she is currently signed with Major Model Management in New York and Studio Model Management in Paris. She was one of the models in the finale of sixth season of Project Runway and walked for TRESemme at Mara Hoffman Spring 2010 show amongst many other shows. She has also modeled for Source, Carmen Marc Valvo and numerous brands and magazines.
Kimberly Leemans is currently signed with Elite Model Management in Chicago, after winning Elite Chicago's E-Tube's contest. She used to be signed with Basic Model Management in New York and International Model Management in Brussels. She was one of the models in the finale of season 6 of Project Runway. She was featured in Ocala magazine. She has appeared on Gossip Girl, Life on Mars, Cupid, Law and Order and HBO's How to Make It in America. In 2014, Kimberly had a small role on The Vampire Diaries as "Young Jo" 
Victoria Marshman has returned to Yale University and started to finish her Medieval History course.
Janet Mills is currently signed with Level Model and Talent Management.
Ebony Morgan has gone back to dental school and was seen in Tyra's Fiercee Awards on The Tyra Banks Show as one of the nominated models.
Saleisha Stowers is currently signed with Elite Model Management in New York and Los Angeles and with L.A. Model Management. In 2013, she joined the cast of the online revival of All My Children, and in 2015, joined the cast of Days of Our Lives''.
Ambreal Williams is currently signed with Click Model Management in Los Angeles.

Notes

References

External links
Official page at The CW
America's Next Top Model at the Internet Movie Database
Entertainment Tonight
Pictures and Official Previews at tv.yahoo.com
TV Guide.com Interviews Eliminated Contestants

A09
2007 American television seasons
Television series set on cruise ships
Television shows filmed in Puerto Rico
Television shows filmed in Antigua and Barbuda
Television shows filmed in California
Television shows filmed in China